The Yellow God: An Idol of Africa is a 1908 novel by H Rider Haggard.

Reception
E. F. Bleiler wrote that The Yellow God was "Not one of Haggard's better works".

References

External links
Complete novel at Project Gutenberg
Images and bibliographic information at www.SouthAfricaBooks.com

Novels by H. Rider Haggard
1908 British novels
1908 fantasy novels